Andrew Downes, also known as Dounaeus (2 February 1628), was an English classical scholar.

Life

He was born in the county of Shropshire, and was educated at Shrewsbury and St. John's College, Cambridge, where he did much to revive the study of Greek, at that time at a very low ebb.

In 1571 he was elected fellow of his college, and, in 1585, he was appointed to the Regius Professor of Greek, which he held for nearly forty years. He died at Coton, near Cambridge, on 2 February 1627/1628. According to Simonds d'Ewes, who attended his lectures on Demosthenes and gives a slight sketch of his personality, Downes was accounted "the ablest Grecian of Christendom."

He published little, but seems to have devoted his chief attention to the Greek orators. A 1587 edition of Plato's Menexenus, the first Greek book printed at Cambridge and the first Greek Plato printed in England, "set as a teaching text...was almost certainly printed as part of the curriculum established by Andrew Downes."  He edited Lysias' Pro caede Eratosthenis (1593); Praelectiones in Philippicam de pace Demosthenis (1621), dedicated to James I of England; some letters (written in Greek) to Isaac Casaubon, printed in the Epistolae of the latter; and notes to John Chrysostom, in Sir Henry Savile's edition. Downes was also one of the seven translators of the Apocrypha for the King James Version of the Bible, and one of the six learned men appointed to revise the new version after its completion.

References

1540s births
1628 deaths
16th-century English writers
Writers from Shropshire
English classical scholars
Translators of the King James Version
People educated at Shrewsbury School
Alumni of St John's College, Cambridge
Fellows of St John's College, Cambridge

16th-century Anglican theologians
17th-century Anglican theologians
Regius Professors of Greek (Cambridge)